Bekkhan Abdulkhamidovich Barakhoyev (born 1 August 1973, Nazran, Checheno-Ingush Autonomous Soviet Socialist Republic) is a Russian political figure, deputy of the 8th State Duma convocation.

In 1994 he graduated from the Chechen-Ingush State University. Barakhoyev started his political career in 2000 when he was appointed an assistant adviser to the first Head of the Republic of Ingushetia Ruslan Aushev. From 2004 to 2011, he served as an assistant to the State Duma deputy Valery Vostrotin; in 2011–2016, he occupied the same position but for the deputy Joseph Kobzon. Until 2021 he was a vice president of the News Outdoor Group's subsidiary CJSC "Olimp".

Since September 2021, he has served as a deputy of the 8th State Duma convocation. He ran with the United Russia.

On 24 March 2022, the United States Treasury sanctioned him in response to the 2022 Russian invasion of Ukraine.

References

1973 births
Living people
People from Nazran
United Russia politicians
21st-century Russian politicians
Eighth convocation members of the State Duma (Russian Federation)
Russian individuals subject to the U.S. Department of the Treasury sanctions